Idealab (formerly known as idealab!) is a startup studio based in Pasadena, California, U.S.A.

History
Idealab was founded by Bill T. Gross (not to be confused with the founder of PIMCO, Bill H. Gross) in March 1996. Prior to Idealab, Gross founded GNP Loudspeakers (now GNP Audio Video), an audio equipment manufacturer; GNP Development Inc., acquired by Lotus Software; and Knowledge Adventure, an educational software company, later acquired by Cendant. Gross graduated with a Bachelor of Science in Mechanical Engineering from the California Institute of Technology and Idealab has historically hired many alumni; Gross now sits on the Institute's board of trustees.

The company leased the right to use the .tv domain, giving the island nation of Tuvalu enough money to join the United Nations in 2000.

In December 2009, the company re-branded and introduced a new logo.

References

External links

Companies based in Pasadena, California
American companies established in 1996
Business incubators of the United States